The 1926–27 season was the first year for the Prairie Hockey League (PHL). The PHL was, in essence, a reorganisation of the Western Hockey League after it folded the previous year. Five teams each played 32 games.

Regular season

Final standings
Note: W = Wins, L = Losses, T = Ties, GF= Goals For, GA = Goals Against, Pts = Points
Teams that qualified for the playoffs are highlighted in bold

Scoring leaders
Note: GP = Games played; G = Goals; A = Assists; Pts = Points; PIM = Penalty minutes

League championship
The Calgary Tigers won the Prairie Hockey League championship by forfeit over the  Saskatoon Sheiks. Saskatoon refused to continue the playoff series after complaining about the referee in game one, won by the Tigers 2–1.

See also
List of NHL seasons
1926 in sports
1927 in sports

Western Canada Hockey League seasons
WCHL